Youssouf Oumarou Alio (born 16 February 1993) is a Nigerien professional footballer who plays for US Monastir and the Nigerien national team.

International career
Oumarou debuted internationally for the Niger national team on 13 November 2015 in a friendly match against Nigeria in a 2–0 loss.

On 16 October 2018, he scored his first goal for Niger against Tunisia in a 2–1 defeat during the 2019 Africa Cup of Nations qualification to be held in Cameroon.

On 8 October 2021, during the 2022 FIFA World Cup qualifying match against Algeria, he scored an own goal which resulted in a 6–1 defeat.

References

1993 births
Living people
Nigerien footballers
Association football midfielders
Niger international footballers
Tunisian Ligue Professionnelle 1 players
Sahel SC players
AS FAN players
US Bitam players
MC Oujda players
KAC Kénitra players
US GN players
FC San-Pédro players
US Monastir (football) players
Nigerien expatriate footballers
Nigerien expatriate sportspeople in Gabon
Expatriate footballers in Gabon
Nigerien expatriate sportspeople in Morocco
Expatriate footballers in Morocco
Nigerien expatriate sportspeople in Ivory Coast
Expatriate footballers in Ivory Coast
Nigerien expatriate sportspeople in Tunisia
Expatriate footballers in Tunisia
Niger A' international footballers
2016 African Nations Championship players